First to Fight may refer to:

 First to Fight (film), a 1967 American film featuring Gene Hackman.
 First to Fight (novel), a novel by Dan Cragg and David Sherman.
 "First to Fight", the motto of the US 24th Infantry Division.
 First to Fight: An Inside View of the U.S. Marine Corps, a book by Lieutenant General Victor H. Krulak, USMC.
 Close Combat: First to Fight, a squad-based military first-person shooter game created by Destineer Studios.